FK Sloga 1976 Lažani is a football club of the Bosniak community based in the village of Lažani near Prilep, North Macedonia. They are currently competing in the Macedonian Third League (South Division).

History
The club was founded in 1976.
They played in the OFS Prilep Division A 2018-19 seasons finish 2nd and recently promoted to Macedonian Third League.

References

External links 
Sloga Lažani at Facebook
Club info at MacedonianFootball 
Football Federation of Macedonia 

Football clubs in North Macedonia
Association football clubs established in 1976
1976 establishments in the Socialist Republic of Macedonia
FK